Needham Mountain is a mountain summit of the Sierra Nevada, located in Tulare County, California. It is located in the southern Sierra Nevada, in the central part of Sequoia National Park. The mountain is named after an American congressman who represented California at the turn of the 19th and 20th centuries, James C. Needham. The first ascent of the summit was made in July 1916, by M. R. Parsons, Agnes Vaile, H. B. Graham, and Edmund Chamberlain.

Climate
Needham Mountain is located in an alpine climate zone. Most weather fronts originate in the Pacific Ocean, and travel east toward the Sierra Nevada mountains. As fronts approach, they are forced upward by the peaks, causing them to drop their moisture in the form of rain or snowfall onto the range (orographic lift). Precipitation runoff from the mountain drains east to Big Arroyo, which is a tributary of the Kern River.

See also
 Great Western Divide

References

External links

 Weather forecast: Needham Mountain

Mountains of Tulare County, California
Mountains of Sequoia National Park
North American 3000 m summits
Mountains of Northern California
Sierra Nevada (United States)